Current Mood is the third studio album by American country music singer Dustin Lynch. It was released on September 8, 2017, via Broken Bow Records. The album includes the singles "Seein' Red", "Small Town Boy", and "I'd Be Jealous Too". The first two singles have both reached number one on the Country Airplay chart.

Content
In advance of the album's release, Lynch released pictures of himself on Twitter wearing shirts related to the album's lyrics and song titles.

The album produced three singles in advance of its release: "Seein' Red", "Small Town Boy." and "I'd Be Jealous Too". The first two singles reached number one on the Billboard Country Airplay charts, and "Small Town Boy" was the fastest rising single of his career and spent four weeks at the top of the chart. "I'd Be Jealous Too" was released as the third single in October 2017.

Karen Fairchild of Little Big Town is featured on the track "Love Me or Leave Me Alone", written by Dustin Christensen.

Commercial performance
The album debuted on Billboards Top Country Albums chart at No. 2 with 27,000 sold, making a total of 36,000 units including streams and tracks. It sold a further 6,100 copies the following week. It has sold 79,800 copies in the US as of October 2018.

Track listing

Charts

Weekly charts

Year-end charts

References

2017 albums
Dustin Lynch albums
BBR Music Group albums